Prix Molson may refer to:

the former name of the Prix Ringuet, a Canadian literary award presented by the Académie des lettres du Québec,
the French language name of the Molson Prize, a Canadian arts award presented by the Canada Council.